Janjgir-Champa is a Lok Sabha parliamentary constituency in Chhattisgarh, India.

Assembly segments
Janjgir-Champa Lok Sabha constituency is reserved for Scheduled Castes (SC) candidates. It is composed of the following assembly segments:

Members of Parliament

^ by poll

Election results

General election 2019

General election 2014

General election 2009

See also
 Janjgir
 List of Constituencies of the Lok Sabha

References

Lok Sabha constituencies in Chhattisgarh
Janjgir-Champa district
Raipur district